Guillermo Evangelista de León, simply known as Gil de León, was a Filipino film actor and director.

Career
He made his first movie after World War II. The movie is Orasang Ginto aka Golden Clock under LVN Pictures where he stayed in the said company for almost 3 decades.

His directorial debut was in Glory at Dawn (1958) under PMP Pictures. He made two movies under MC Production such as Juan Tamad with Manuel Conde and Vende Cristo. He played most of his film as a villain and other supporting roles. He continued acting up to the 1980s.

Personal life
He married LVN movie star, Lilia Dizon, until they separated in the 1966. They have three children, who inherited their talents in acting: Pinky de León. the eldest, Christopher de León and Lara Melissa de León.

Filmography
1946 - Orasang Ginto  [LVN]
1946 - Garrison 13  [LVN]
1947 - Kamagong  [Nolasco]
1947 - Si Juan Tamad  [MC]
1947 - Caprichosa  [Premiere]
1947 - Binatang Maynila  [RDS]
1947 - Pangarap ko'y Ikaw Rin  [Premiere]
1947 - Hacendera  [Phils Artists]
1948 - Krus ng Digma  [X'Otic]
1948 - Matimtiman  [Pangilinan]
1948 - Siete Dolores  [Nolasco Bros.]
1948 - Mga Busabos ng Palad  [Nolasco]
1948 - Vende Cristo  [MC]
1949 - Parola  [LVN]
1949 - Maria Beles  [LVN]
1949 - Tambol Mayor  [LVN]
1949 - Kuba sa Quiapo  [LVN]
1949 - Sagur  [X'Otic]
1949 - Dasalang Ginto  [Filcudoma]
1949 - Biglang Yaman  [LVN]
1950 - Florante at Laura  [LVN]
1950 - Nuno sa Punso  [LVN]
1950 - Doble Cara  [Premiere]
1951 - Ang Tapis mo Inday  [LVN]
1951 - Reyna Elena  [LVN]
1951 - Sigfredo  [Lebran]
1951 - Bohemyo  [LVN]
1951 - Dalawang Prinsipeng Kambal  [LVN]
1951 - Romeo at Julieta  [Lebran]
1952 - Kambal-Tuko  [LVN]
1952 - Taong Paniki  [LVN]
1953 - Philippine Navy  [LVN]
1953 - Kuwintas ng Pasakit  [LVN]
1953 - Squatter  [LVN]
1953 - Dagohoy  [LVN]
1953 - Hiyasmin  [LVN]
1954 - Krus na Bakal  [LVN]
1954 - Donato  [LVN]
1955 - Sanda Wong  [Manuel Vistan/Champion Ho]
1957 - Objective: Patayin si Magsaysay  [Champion]
1958 - Glory at Dawn  [PMP]  (dir)

References

External links

1916 births
G
Filipino male film actors
Year of death missing